BES or Bes may refer to:

 Bes, Egyptian deity
 Bes (coin), Roman coin denomination
 Bes (Marvel Comics), fictional character loosely based on the Egyptian deity

Abbreviations 
 Bachelor of Environmental Studies, a degree
 Banco Espírito Santo, a Portuguese banking group
 Beryllium sulfide, formula BeS
 BES islands, Caribbean
 BES III, Beijing Spectrometer III, particle physics experiment
 BlackBerry Enterprise Server, software
 Brest Bretagne Airport, France, IATA code
 Bloodstream expression site, a transcription unit in a genome
 British Election Study

People 
 Cristina Bes Ginesta (born 1977), Catalan ski mountaineer